WFVR-LP (96.5 FM) is a radio station licensed to serve the community of South Royalton, Vermont. The station is owned by Royalton Community Radio. It airs a variety format.

The station was assigned the WFVR-LP call letters by the Federal Communications Commission on March 27, 2014.

References

External links
 Official Website
 
 WFVR-LP playlists on Spinitron

FVR-LP
FVR-LP
Radio stations established in 2015
2015 establishments in Vermont
Variety radio stations in the United States
Windsor County, Vermont